Knowledge Park I or Knowledge Park 1 is a sector in south-western Greater Noida, Uttar Pradesh, India. Bordered by Knowledge Park II to the west and Omega II to the south, it serves the Pari Chowk metro station alongside several universities and colleges, including Ram-Eesh Group of Institutions, the National Institute of Management and Technology and Harlal Institute of Management and Technology.

References 

Geography of Uttar Pradesh